Alfred William Lacey (born January 31, 1942) is Canadian former politician. He served in the Legislative Assembly of New Brunswick from 1987 to 1991 as a Liberal member from the constituency of York South.

References

1942 births
Living people
New Brunswick Liberal Association MLAs
Politicians from Saint John, New Brunswick